Fremmedarbejderbladet was a journal for foreign workers in Denmark that was published monthly from 1971 through 1977. The paper was published in Danish, Turkish and Serbo-Croatian for its entire duration, in Arabic from 1971-1972, in Urdu from 1971-1972 and 1973-1977, and in English from 1972-1973. Ole Hammer served as editor-in-chief. The paper catered especially to foreign workers who arrived in Denmark from the 1960s through 1973 from Turkey, Yugoslavia, Pakistan, the Middle East and North Africa (comparable to the Gastarbeiter in Germany), and provided information about housing, work permits, collective bargaining, taxes, health and safety at work, and Danish culture more generally.

Fremmedarbejderbladet received funding from a variety of sources, including the Danish Employers Association (DA), the Danish Confederation of Trade Unions (LO), the Danish Federation of Unskilled Laborers and Specialist Workers (DASF, or SiD), the Ministry of Labor, the Danish Association for International Co-operation (Mellemfolkeligt Samvirke or MS), the Danish Smith and Machine Workers Association (today Danish Union of Metalworkers), and from advertisements and subscriptions.

References

1971 establishments in Denmark
1977 disestablishments in Denmark
Defunct newspapers published in Denmark
Newspapers established in 1971
Publications disestablished in 1977
Arabic-language newspapers
English-language newspapers published in Europe
Serbo-Croatian-language mass media
Turkish-language newspapers
Urdu-language newspapers
Danish-language newspapers